Calling Time is the fifth studio album by Swedish musician Basshunter. It was released on 13 May 2013.

Background and release
Basshunter started working on the album in October 2010. It was announced that the album will feature the single "Saturday", released 5 July 2010. It was initially planned that the album would be released in early 2011. In April 2011, the Basshunter recorded with the participants of the Swedish edition of Big Brother, "Fest i hela huset". In the same month, it was announced that Basshunter was working with Kerry Katona on a new song entitled "You're Not Alone". During live performances in June 2011, Basshunter performed two songs from the album: "Calling Time" and "Dream on the Dancefloor". In July, the artist announced that the album will be a mix of different genres of music, including trance.

In early 2012, Basshunter released demos preluding the album, which included early versions of "Dirty" (titled as "Dirty Dancefloor"), and "Lawnmower to Music" (titled as "The Art of Transformation"). The "I Will Never Turn Around", "All the People" and "My Flesh and Blood" tracks that were uploaded online never made it to the final track listing of the album. On 21 April 2012, Basshunter premiered the single, "Northern Light". In July 2012, Bashunter announced that the album will feature new versions of track "Sandra (I Don't Wanna Be Alone)" and "Elinor" and the new song "Open Your Eyes". On 18 November 2012, the single, "Dream on the Dancefloor" was released. In January 2013, Techno4ever.FM, Vol.1 compilation album was released including a track from the new album titled as "Far Far Away".

In February 2013, Basshunter recorded new songs with the members of Ultrabeat. In March 2013, he released four songs from the new album, which included the demo version of "Calling Time" and "Open My Eyes". Basshunter announced the album release would be postponed because he wanted to do something new and different from before, and to get to new fans. In early May 2013, the album's cover and the title was revealed. Basshunter announced that it he had recorded over 30 tracks and demos and had to select the final 15 that would feature on the album.

Track listing

Notes
"Saturday" is replaced by "Open Your Eyes" on the UK and Ireland versions of the album.

Charts

Release history

References

External links 
 

2013 albums
Basshunter albums
Ultra Records albums
Warner Music Sweden albums